Musiani is an Italian surname. Notable people with the surname include:

 Lautaro Musiani (born 1996), Argentine cricketer
 Paola Musiani (1949–1985), Italian singer 

Italian-language surnames